is a Japanese professional shogi player ranked 4-dan.

Early life and education
Tomoki Yokoyama was born in Kakogawa, Hyōgo on January 26, 2000. He learned how to play shogi from his father, and was accepted into the Japan Shogi Association's (JSA) apprentice school at the rank of 6-kyū under the tutelage of shogi professional Keita Inoue in September 2012.

Yokoyma was promoted to the rank of apprentice professional 1-dan in 2014, and apprentice profssional 3-dan in 2017. He obtained full professional status and the corresponding rank of 4-dan in September 2021 after tying for first with Mikio Kariyama in the 69th 3-dan League (April 2021September 2021) with a record of 13 wins and 5 losses.

Yokoyama is currently a fourth-year student in the Faculty of Law of Konan University. He is the first student from the school to become a professional shogi player.

Promotion history
The promotion history for Yokoyama is as follows.

6-kyū: September 1, 2012
1-dan: December 23, 2014
3-dan: October 2017
4-dan: October 1, 2021

References

External links
 ShogiHub: Professional Player Info · Yokoyama, Tomoki

Living people
2000 births
Japanese shogi players
Professional shogi players
People from Kakogawa, Hyōgo
Professional shogi players from Hyōgo Prefecture
Konan University alumni